Turate (Comasco,) is a comune (municipality) in the Province of Como in the Italian region Lombardy, located about  northwest of Milan and about  southwest of Como.

Turate borders the following municipalities: Cirimido, Cislago, Fenegrò, Gerenzano, Limido Comasco, Lomazzo, Rovello Porro.

References

External links
 Official website

Cities and towns in Lombardy